Statistics of Dhivehi League in the 1993 season.

Overview
Club Valencia won the championship.

References
RSSSF

Dhivehi League seasons
Maldives
Maldives
football